Lydia Marie Mackay is an American voice and stage actress, known internationally for her work for Funimation and OkraTron 5000. She has provided voices for a number of English versions of Japanese anime films, television series and video games.

Early life
Mackay was born in Fort Worth, Texas.

Filmography

Anime series

Animation
 Red vs. Blue – Kalirama the Undying

Film

Video games

References

External links

Lydia Mackay at CrystalAcids Anime Voice Actor Database

 Lydia Mackay at TCU Department of Theater - Faculty Member

Living people
Actresses from Dallas
Actresses from Texas
American film actresses
American stage actresses
American television actresses
American video game actresses
American voice actresses
People from Fort Worth, Texas
Southern Methodist University alumni
Texas Christian University faculty
Texas Wesleyan University alumni
21st-century American actresses
American women academics
Year of birth missing (living people)